The Extraordinary and Plenipotentiary Ambassador of Peru to the Kingdom of Norway is the official representative of the Republic of Peru to the Kingdom of Norway. The ambassador in Oslo is also accredited to Iceland since 2018.

Both countries established diplomatic relations in the 20th century, and Peru opened an embassy in Oslo in June 2017.

List of representatives

See also
List of ambassadors of Peru to Denmark
List of ambassadors of Peru to Finland
List of ambassadors of Peru to Sweden

References

Norway
Peru